Mustjala  is a village in Saaremaa Parish, Saare County in western Estonia.

Before the administrative reform in 2017, the village was in Mustjala Parish.

Admiralty Baltic Pilot Vol II mentions that Mustjala Church, a white stone building with a dark roof, as a 'Useful Mark' for shipping.

References

Villages in Saare County